Centerfield may refer to:

Places in the United States
Centerfield, Kentucky
Centerfield, New York
Centerfield, Utah

Other uses
Centerfield (album), by John Fogerty
"Centerfield" (song), by John Fogerty
Center fielder, outfield position in baseball and softball